The collared myna (Acridotheres albocinctus) is a species of starling in the family Sturnidae.

It is found in China, India, and Myanmar.

References

collared myna
collared myna
Birds of Myanmar
Birds of Northeast India
Birds of Yunnan
collared myna
collared myna
Taxonomy articles created by Polbot